Yu Chongwen (15 February 1924 – 12 June 2022) was a Chinese scientist who was a professor at the China University of Geosciences, and an academician of the Chinese Academy of Sciences.

Biography
Yu was born in Shanghai, on 15 February 1924, while his ancestral home is in Ningbo, Zhejiang. He secondary studied at Shanghai Nanyang High School. In 1944, he entered National Southwestern Associated University and graduated from the Department of Geology, Peking University in 1950. He stayed at the university and worked as an assistant after graduation. In 1952, he joined the faculty of China University of Geosciences, where he founded the Department of Geochemistry later and was promoted to professor in 1980. 

On 12 June 2022, he died from an illness in Beijing, at the age of 98.

Honours and awards
 1988 State Science and Technology Progress Award (Second Class) for ore controlling conditions, material composition and distribution of tungsten, lead, zinc and other non-ferrous rare metal deposits in Nanling area
 1995 Member of the Chinese Academy of Sciences (CAS)

Publication

References

1924 births
2022 deaths
Chinese geochemists
Scientists from Shanghai
National Southwestern Associated University alumni
National University of Peking alumni
Academic staff of Peking University
Academic staff of China University of Geosciences
Members of the Chinese Academy of Sciences